Justin Kelly may refer to:
Justin Kelly (actor), Canadian actor
Justin Kelly (director), film director
Justin Kelly (ice hockey), professional ice hockey player